Atahualpa is a barrio (neighbourhood or district) of Montevideo, Uruguay.

Location
Atahualpa shares borders with Prado to the west, Aires Puros to the north, Brazo Oriental to the east and Reducto to the south.

See also 
Barrios of Montevideo

External links 

 Comisión de Vecinos del Barrio Atahualpa
 Intendencia de Montevideo / Historia / Barrios / (see section) El paseo del Prado
 Revista Raices / Historia del barrio Atahualpa

 
Barrios of Montevideo